The R697 road is a regional road in Ireland which runs north-south from the centre of Kilkenny in County Kilkenny to the N24 national primary road in Carrick-on-Suir in County Tipperary.

See also
Roads in Ireland
National primary road

References
Roads Act 1993 (Classification of Regional Roads) Order 2006 – Department of Transport

Regional roads in the Republic of Ireland
Roads in County Kilkenny
Roads in County Tipperary